Number Cruncher Politics is a political analysis and polling consultancy and blog site launched in 2014. The site is non-partisan and focusses on UK opinion polling, psephology, and statistical analysis. It is perhaps best known for correctly predicting the polling failure at the 2015 general election.

History

On the eve the 2015 UK election, the site published a lengthy analysis of opinion polling accuracy by its founder Matt Singh, based on decades of polling and election data. The report suggested that, contrary to the close race suggested by opinion polls and forecasts, the Conservative Party would win by more than six percentage points and could win an overall majority. In the event, the Conservative lead in the popular vote was 6.6 points, giving the party an overall majority of 12 seats. After the publication of the broadcasters' exit poll, the post containing the analysis attracted sufficient traffic to crash the website.

At the Scottish independence referendum, the site was credited by FiveThirtyEight with the most accurate regional prediction.

References

External links 
 Number Cruncher Politics

Psephology
Polling
British political websites